Lahaul and Spiti may refer to:
 Lahaul and Spiti district, a district in Himachal Pradesh, India
 Lahaul and Spiti (Vidhan Sabha constituency), the state assembly constituency encompassing the district

See also
 Spiti (disambiguation)